was the fifty-ninth of the sixty-nine stations of the Nakasendō connecting Edo with Kyoto in Edo period Japan. It is located in former Mino Province in what is now part of the town of Sekigahara, Fuwa District, Gifu Prefecture, Japan.

History
Imasu-juku was located on the ancient Tōsandō highway connecting the capital of Heian-kyō with the provinces of eastern Japan, and near the border of Ōmi Province with Mino Province. 

In the early Edo period, the system of post stations on the Nakasendō was formalized by the Tokugawa shogunate in 1602, and it was a stopping place for traveling merchants who originated from Ōmi Province.  It was also on the sankin-kōtai route used by various western daimyō to-and-from the Shogun's court in Edo. It was also on the Kurihangaidō (九里半街道), a trade road that connected the northwestern shores of Lake Biwa with Obama.  Imasu is 447 kilometers from Edo. Nearby Sekigahara Pass has some of the heaviest snowfalls in Japan, and travelers trapped by early snowfall in autumn were forced to spend time at Imazu until the road became passable. 

Following the Meiji restoration, traffic on the Nakasendō all but disappeared; prices increased and in 1969 after a bad harvest, the peasants around Imazu rose in revolt, demanding debt cancellation and the release of stored rice to avoid famine. The station official appealed to Ōgaki Domain, which sent troops to suppress the uprising by force. This was an indication of how Imasu-juku, once quite prosperous, had declined.

Imasu-juku in The Sixty-nine Stations of the Kiso Kaidō
Utagawa Hiroshige's ukiyo-e print of Imasu-juku dates from 1835 -1838. The print emphasizes the location by depicting a border post proclaiming "Mino-Ōmi border".  A traveller stops to read this inscription while another gets a light for his pipe from a man seated in front of a teahouse. Above him is a sign promoting  “bien Sennjoko”, a cosmetic produced by the patron who subsidized this print series. Farther down the road is a man with two barrels wrapped in straw  suspended by a pole over his shoulder, and there are shops for traveller's necessities, such as straw hats and sandals. Several travellers also arriving from the other direction, indicating the busy nature of this post station. In the plains below, crops have been harvested, indicating that the setting is autumn.

Neighboring post towns
Nakasendō
Sekigahara-juku - Imasu-juku - Kashiwabara-juku

References

External links

Hiroshige Kiso-Kaido series
Imasu-juku on Kiso Kaido Road
Gifu Nakasendo Guide

Notes

Stations of the Nakasendō
Post stations in Gifu Prefecture
Sekigahara, Gifu
Mino Province